Guerra Conjugal (English: Conjugal Warfare) is a 1975 Brazilian film directed by Joaquim Pedro de Andrade. The screenplay is an adaptation of Dalton Trevisan's short stories.

Cast
Carmen Silva...	Amália
Joffre Soares...	Joãozinho
Oswaldo Louzada...	João Corno
Elza Gomes...	Dona Gabriela (a avó chata cega)
Cristina Aché...	Neusa, a "Neusinha"
Carlos Gregório...	Nelsinho
Carlos Kroeber...	João Bicha
Maria Lúcia Dahl...	Lúcia
Wilza Carla...	Gorda (Maria's mother)
Lima Duarte...	Dr. Osíris
Dirce Migliaccio...	D. Laura
Ítala Nandi...	Olga
Analu Prestes...	Maria da Perdição
Maria Veloso...	Sofia, Velha Querida
Zélia Zamyr...	Maria da Gorda
Lutero Luiz...	Joãozinho's son
Virgínia Moreira...	old prostitute

Awards 
1975: Brasília Film Festival
Best Film (won)
Best Director (Joaquim Pedro de Andrade) (won)
Best Editing (Eduardo Escorel) (won)

1976: São Paulo Association of Art Critics Awards
Best Actor (Carlos Gregório) (won)

References

External links 
 

1975 films
1970s Portuguese-language films
Brazilian comedy films